Waldemar Kobus (born 1966) is a German actor.

Biography

Kobus was born in Szczytno, Poland and, as an ethnic German, moved to Germany in 1970. From 1988 until 1991 he attended the Otto-Falckenberg-Schule school of performing arts in Munich, Germany. Afterwards he performed in several theatre plays in Frankfurt, Bochum, Stuttgart, Zürich, Vienna and Cologne. He has starred in TV shows since the early 1990s and as of 2001 began to be recognised by the public for his roles in movies and TV shows, in particular thanks to his role in the German comedy show Alles Atze, in which he plays the police officer 'Viktor Schimanek'. His international breakthrough was his 'SS officer Günther Franken' role in the movie Zwartboek (Black Book) by Dutch director Paul Verhoeven.

In 2007 he spoke the voice of the Yeti in the animation movie Lissi und der wilde Kaiser. He also played in the movie Speed Racer from the sisters Lilly (formerly Andy) and Lana (formerly Larry) Wachowski. In the movie Valkyrie (with Tom Cruise) he plays the police-chief of Berlin. In October 2008 he starred in the WWII movie Miracle at St. Anna from director Spike Lee.

Besides acting, he is a singer and has performed at the Kölner Karneval. He has collaborated on songs with the composers  Klaus Fehling and Uli Winters.

Personal life

Waldemar Kobus is married to the German actress Traute Hoess. Together they live in Bochum.

Filmography

 Ein Fall für TKKG: Drachenauge (1992) - Otto
 Sonnenallee (1999) - Samson
 Alles Atze (2000–2007) - Viktor Schimanek / Hektor
 Narren (2003) - Wirt
 Besser als Schule (2004) - Ralph
 Traumschiff Surprise – Periode 1 (2004) - Hofwache
 Das Zimmermädchen und der Millionär (2004) - Arnold Heinrich
 Black Book (2006) - Günther Franken
 Waiter (2006) - Richard
 Die Österreichische Methode (2006) - Hausmeister in Skihalle
 Fashion Victims (2007) - Banker Harald Topfmöller
 Rudy: The Return of the Racing Pig (2007) - Polizist
  (2007) - Harry Möller (segment "Artikel 9")
 Freischwimmer (2007) - Kellner
 Lissi no reino dos birutas (2007) - Yeti (voice)
 Beautiful Bitch (2007) - Wirt
 Jakobs Bruder (2007) - Matthias Goldt
  (2007) - Dr. Wesener
 Speed Racer (2008) - Vinny - Cruncher Thug
 Mordshunger (2008) - Stephan Bronski
 Miracle at St. Anna (2008) - Colonel Pflueger
 Valkyrie (2008) - Police Chief Wolf-Heinrich von Helldorf
 Die Wilden Hühner und das Leben (2009) - Herr Megert
 Schläft ein Lied in allen Dingen (2009) - Wolle
  (2009) - Franz Kogler
 Vicky the Viking (2009) - Halvar - Wickie's father
  (2009) - Schulze
 Jew Suss: Rise and Fall (2010) - Eberhard Frowein
  (2010) - Manni
 Nemesis (2010) - Karl
 Alive and Ticking (2011) - Daddy Strumpf
 Vicky and the Treasure of the Gods (2011) - Halvar
 Das Haus der Krokodile (2012) - Herr Strichninsky
 Russian Disco (2012) - Rabbi
  (2012) - Karsten Leimer
  (2013) - Battista Rossi
 Wendy (2017) - Klaus Röttgers
 The Zookeeper's Wife (2017) - Dr. Ziegler
  (2017) - Dr. Kohlbuch
 The Captain (2017) - Hansen
 Seneca – On the Creation of Earthquakes (2023)

References

External links

1966 births
Living people
People from Szczytno
German male television actors
German male film actors